The Varga 2150 Kachina is an American all-metal, low-wing, fixed-gear, two-seat light aircraft fitted with a tricycle undercarriage.

Design
In 1948, US aircraft test pilot/aircraft designer W.J. Morrisey produced a wood-and-fabric light aircraft, the 1000C (Nifty). In 1958 he reworked that basic design, giving it an all-metal structure and increased power. The aircraft is a cantilever low-wing monoplane with plain ailerons and two-position trailing-edge flaps, conventional empennage, fixed nosewheel landing gear, and tandem seating. Dual controls are provided as standard equipment.

Development
In 1958 The Morrisey Aviation Inc. company began building the re-designed aircraft. Two units were completed as the Morrisey 2000. A further improvement came with the Morrisey 2150, incorporating a 108 hp Lycoming O-235 engine. The company built nine aircraft by the end of 1959.

The construction and design rights were then sold to Shinn Engineering Inc. which built 35 improved Shinn 2150A aircraft with a  Lycoming O-320-A2C engine, before ceasing production in 1962.

The 2150A design rights were sold in 1967 to used aircraft parts supplier George Varga who formed the Varga Aircraft Corporation. The Varga 2150A Kachina was built at Chandler, Arizona between 1975 and 1982. 121 2150A Kachinas were completed together with 18 examples of the Varga 2180 with a 180 hp Lycoming O-360-A2D engine. A tailwheel option was available as the Varga 2150TG.

Bill Morrisey later re-acquired the design rights and then launched a kit version of the original Morrisey 2000C.

The Morrisey/Shinn/Varga 2150 remains in widespread use in the US and several aircraft are flown in Europe and South America.

Variants
Morrisey 2000C
Variant with Lycoming O-235 engine
Morrisey 2150
Variant with Lycoming O-320-A2C engine.
Shinn 2150
Morrisey 2150 built by Shinn Engineering.
Varga 2150A Kachina
Morrisey 2150 built by Varga Aircraft.
Varga 2150TG
Tailwheel version of the 2150A
Varga 2180 Kachina
Variant with Lycoming O-360-A2D engine.

Specifications (2150A)

See also

Notes

References

1950s United States civil utility aircraft
Single-engined tractor aircraft
Low-wing aircraft
Aircraft first flown in 1958